Mark Trombino (born May 23, 1966) is an American multi-platinum record producer, musician, and audio engineer. He has produced, engineered, and mixed tracks for many artists including Jimmy Eat World, Blink-182, The Starting Line, Finch, Motion City Soundtrack, and All Time Low. As a drummer, he recorded and toured with Drive Like Jehu, aMiniature, Night Soil Man, and First Offense.

Since 2013 Trombino has been active in the boutique food space, running a donut shop called "Donut Friend" in the Highland Park neighborhood of Los Angeles. In 2019 a second location was opened in downtown Los Angeles. In January 2021, Trombino came under fire after an anonymous Twitter account claimed he terminated several employees for attempting to organize for better working conditions and form a union. Trombino, as well as current and former employees, stated that the information in the tweet was false.

Selected discography

Accomplishments

References

External links
AllMusic
RIAA.com
Tears of our Tracks
Eater.com

1966 births
Living people
American record producers
Drive Like Jehu members
American people of Italian descent
Jimmy Eat World
American rock drummers
Punk rock record producers
20th-century American drummers
American male drummers